Gasparetto is a surname. Notable people with the surname include:

 Daniele Gasparetto (born 1988), Italian footballer
 Mirco Gasparetto (born 1980), Italian footballer
 Zíbia Gasparetto (1926–2018), Brazilian spiritualist writer

See also
Gasparotto

Surnames of Italian origin
Italian-language surnames